Fredrik Jakob Tage Ulfstand Rosencrantz (26 October 1879 – 15 April 1957) was a Swedish Army captain and horse rider who competed in the 1912 Summer Olympics. He was a member of the Swedish team that won the gold medal in jumping; however, he was not awarded a medal because only three best riders from each team were counted, and he placed fourth.

Rosencrantz became ryttmästare in 1913 and was placed in the Life Regiment Hussars' reserve in 1928.

References

1879 births
1957 deaths
Swedish Army officers
Swedish male equestrians
Olympic equestrians of Sweden
Equestrians at the 1912 Summer Olympics
Olympic gold medalists for Sweden
Swedish show jumping riders
Olympic medalists in equestrian
People from Tomelilla Municipality
Medalists at the 1912 Summer Olympics
Sportspeople from Skåne County